Riachuelo is a word in the Spanish language, meaning a small river with little current or a brook or an arroyo.

Riachuelo may also refer to:

Places

Argentina 
 Riachuelo River or Matanza River, a stream in the Buenos Aires Province
 Villa Riachuelo, a barrio of Buenos Aires

Brazil 
 Riachuelo, Rio de Janeiro, a neighborhood of Rio de Janeiro, Brazil
 Riachuelo, Sergipe, a municipality in the Brazilian state of Sergipe
 Riachuelo, Rio Grande do Norte, a municipality in the state of Rio Grande do Norte

Chile 
Riachuelo, Chile, a village in Osorno Province, south-central Chile

Uruguay 

 Riachuelo, Uruguay a Populated Centre in Colonia Department

Battle
 Battle of the Riachuelo, a naval battle in the Paraguayan War named for Riachuelo stream, Corrientes Province, Argentina

Ships
 Brazilian battleship Riachuelo, an 1883 Brazilian ironclad battleship
 Brazilian battleship Riachuelo (1914), a Brazilian battleship cancelled due to World War I
 Brazilian submarine Riachuelo (S22), a 1975 Oberon-class submarine now a museum ship in Rio de Janeiro
 Brazilian submarine Riachuelo (S40), a brazilian submarine, leader of Riachuelo Class

Companies
 Lojas Riachuelo, a Brazilian department store company

Films
 Riachuelo (film), 1934 film directed by Luis Moglia Barth

Geology

 The Riachuelo Formation, an Early to Late Cretaceous geological formation, located near Riachuelo, Sergipe State, Brazil